Herschella Horton (December 15, 1938 – May 4, 2022) was an American politician who served in the Arizona House of Representatives from the 14th district from 1991 to 2001.

References

1938 births
2022 deaths
People from Lawrenceville, Illinois
Democratic Party members of the Arizona House of Representatives
Women state legislators in Arizona